The 1926–27 Pittsburgh Pirates season was the second season of the Pirates ice hockey team in the National Hockey League.

Offseason

Regular season

Final standings

Record vs. opponents

Game log

Playoffs
The Pirates did not qualify for the playoffs

Player stats

Regular season
Scoring

Goaltending

Note: GP = Games played; G = Goals; A = Assists; Pts = Points; +/- = Plus/Minus; PIM = Penalty Minutes; PPG=Power-play goals; SHG=Short-handed goals; GWG=Game-winning goals
      MIN=Minutes played; W = Wins; L = Losses; T = Ties; GA = Goals against; GAA = Goals against average; SO = Shutouts;

Awards and records

Transactions

See also
1926–27 NHL season

References

Pittsburgh
Pittsburgh
Pittsburgh Pirates (NHL) seasons